La Haye may refer to:

 The Hague in the Netherlands

Locations in Belgium
 La Haye, Lasne, a farmhouse at the eastern end of the Waterloo Battlefield
 La Haye Sainte, a farmhouse at the centre of the Waterloo Battlefield
 La Haye, Saint-Amand or Saint-Amand-la-Haye, a hamlet at the centre of the Ligny Battlefield

Communes in France:
La Haye, Manche, in the Manche département 
La Haye, Seine-Maritime, in the Seine-Maritime département
La Haye, Vosges, in the Vosges département 
La Haye-Aubrée, in the Eure département
La Haye-Bellefond, in the Manche département 
La Haye-de-Calleville, in the Eure département
La Haye-d'Ectot, in the Manche département 
La Haye-de-Routot, in the Eure département 
La Haye-du-Theil, in the Eure département
La Haye-en-Touraine (currently named Descartes), in the Indre-et-Loire département, the birthplace of René Descartes 
La Haye-le-Comte, in the Eure département 
La Haye-Malherbe, in the Eure département
La Haye-Pesnel, in the Manche département 
La Haye-Saint-Sylvestre, in the Eure département

See also
Tim LaHaye
LaHaye Ice Center